Qadi Kamal al-Din Husayn ibn Mu'in al-Din Ali Maybudi, better known as Qadi Husayn Maybudi, was an Iranian scholar and qadi (judge) in the city of Yazd under the Aq Qoyunlu. He was executed in 1504 after having participated in a failed revolt against the Safavid shah (king) Ismail I.

Biography 

Born in 1449, Maybudi was presumably a native of the city of Maybud in southern Iran, rather than the neighbouring city of Yazd. The area was then part of the Timurid Empire. He belonged to an affluent and influential family of aristocratic origin. He was the son of Khwaja Mu'in al-Din Ali, a prominent philanthropist and vizier of Yazd. At a young age, Maybudi left for Shiraz to study under prominent scholars such as Jalal al-Din Davani (died 1503). He was executed in 1504 after having participated in a failed revolt against the Safavid shah (king) Ismail I. He was survived by at least one of his sons, Mirza Abd al-Rashid al-Munajjim.

His works 
 Sharh al-hidayah (famous commentary on Athir al-Din al-Abhari, cf. Browne IV, p. 57: "Maybodi's commentary . . . is still the favourite text-book for beginners in philosophy . . .")
 Sharh-i Divan-i Ali ibn Abi Talib (Commentary on the poem of Ali ibn Abi Talib). The book has been published by Miras-i Maktub; Chap-i 1 edition (2000), Published in 1998, 
 Munsha'at  
 Jam-i giti-numa
 Sharh al-Kafiyah fi al-Nahw
Kashf al-asrār waʿuddat al-abrār (The Unveiling of the Secrets and the Provisions of the Righteous), a ten-volume Persian commentary on the Quran

References

Sources 
 
 
 

15th-century Iranian philosophers
16th-century Iranian philosophers
Islamic philosophers
Iranian scholars
1504 deaths
Year of birth unknown
15th-century scholars
16th-century scholars
Rebellions against Safavid Iran
Scholars of the Aq Qoyunlu
People executed by Safavid Iran